Bell County is a county in the U.S. state of Texas. It is in Central Texas and its county seat is Belton.

As of the 2020 census, its population was 370,647. Bell County is part of the Killeen–Temple, Texas, Metropolitan Statistical Area.

The county was founded in 1850 and is named for Peter Hansborough Bell, the third governor of Texas.

In 2010, the center of population of Texas was located in Bell County, near the town of Holland.

History
In 1834–1835, Little River became part of Robertson's Colony, made up of settlers from Nashville, Tennessee, led by Sterling C. Robertson; they were the families of Captain Goldsby Childers, Robert Davison, John Fulcher, Moses Griffin, John Needham, Michael Reed and his son William Whitaker Reed, William Taylor, and Judge Orville T. Tyler. This area became known as the Tennessee Valley. Soon after (1836) the settlements were deserted during the Runaway Scrape, reoccupied, deserted again after the Elmwood Creek Blood Scrape, and reoccupied. Texas Ranger George Erath established a fort on Little River.

During 1843–44, settlers began returning.  The next year, the Republic of Texas founded Baylor Female College (since developed as University of Mary Hardin–Baylor).

In 1850, Bell County was organized and named for Texas Governor Peter Hansborough Bell. The population then was 600 whites and 60 black slaves.  Belton was designated as the county seat in 1851.

The last serious Indian raid in the area occurred in 1859.   Bell County assumed its present boundaries with the 1860 resurvey of the line between Bell and Milam Counties.

In 1861, the county voted for secession from the Union. Residents were divided, as many yeomen farmers did not support the war. From 1862 to 1865, Union sympathizers and Confederate deserters holed up in "Camp Safety". Following the war, new social movements developed. In 1867, the Belton Women's Commonwealth, the first women's movement in Central Texas, was formed by Martha McWhirter. The group provided shelter to women in abusive relationships.

During the early years of the Reconstruction era (1865–1877), so much violence occurred in the county, the government stationed federal troops in Belton. Some racist whites attacked blacks and their white supporters. Corruption, lawlessness, and racial divides were severe. As in many areas, a local version of white paramilitary insurgents developed who were similar to the KKK; they worked to suppress black and Republican voting.

The coming of railroads in the late 19th century stimulated growth across the state. In 1881, the Gulf, Colorado and Santa Fe Railway, the first railroad to be built in Bell County, established Temple as its headquarters. Reflecting growth in the county, in 1884, the Bell County Courthouse was built. It is still used. The ambitious Renaissance Revival design was by architect Jasper N. Preston and Sons. As another improvement, in 1905, the Belton and Temple Interurban electric railway was completed, providing service between the cities.

During the 1920s, the Ku Klux Klan underwent a revival in Bell County. In many areas, it was concentrated on nativist issues, opposing Catholic and Jewish immigration from eastern and southern Europe. After a scandal involving the leader of the KKK, the group's influence declined markedly by the end of the decade.

In 1925, Miriam A. Ferguson, a native of the county, was inaugurated as the first woman governor of the state. She won re-election in 1932 for a nonconsecutive second term.

The county and state supported founding Temple Junior College in 1926. The entry of the United States in World War II stimulated war spending across the country. In 1942, Fort Hood was opened as a military training base. It drew recruits from across the country.

The postwar period was one of suburbanization in many areas. In 1956, the Killeen school board voted to integrate the local high school. This followed the Brown v. Board of Education (1954) ruling by the US Supreme Court that racial segregation in public schools, supported by all the taxpayers, was unconstitutional.

The state founded Central Texas College in 1965 in Killeen.

Since the late 20th century, new retail development has taken the form of large malls. In 1976, Temple Mall opened. By 1980, Killeen had become the largest city in Bell County. The next year, the Killeen Mall opened, adding to retail choices in the area. In another type of development, in 1987, the Bell County Expo Center opened.

Since the late 20th century, the county has been the site of several mass shootings. On October 16, 1991, in the Luby's shooting, George Hennard killed 23 people and wounded 20 others before killing himself. It was the deadliest mass shooting in the United States at the time. On November 5, in the 2009 Fort Hood shooting, Army Major Nidal Hasan killed 13 people and wounded 30 others before being paralyzed in return fire. On April 2, in the 2014 Fort Hood shootings, Army Specialist Ivan Lopez killed three people and wounded 16 others.

Geography

Adjacent counties
 McLennan County (north)
 Falls County (northeast)
 Milam County (southeast)
 Williamson County (south)
 Burnet County (southwest)
 Lampasas County (west)
 Coryell County (northwest)

Demographics

Note: the US Census treats Hispanic/Latino as an ethnic category. This table excludes Latinos from the racial categories and assigns them to a separate category. Hispanics/Latinos can be of any race.

As of the census of 2010,  310,235 people, 114,035 households, and 80,449 families resided in the county. The population density was 295.2 people per square mile (87/km2). The 125,470 housing units averaged 88 per square mile (34/km2). The racial makeup of the county was 61.4% White, 21.5% Black, 0.8% Native American, 2.8% Asian, 0.8% Pacific Islander, and 5.0% from two or more races. About 21.6% of the population was Hispanic or Latino of any race; 14.9% were of Mexican, 3.6% were of Puerto Rican, 0.2% Cuban, and 0.2% were of Dominican descent.

Of the 85,507 households, 40.10% had children under the age of 18 living with them, 56.60% were married couples living together, 12.30% had a female householder with no husband present, and 27.50% were not families. About 22.30% of all households were made up of individuals, and 6.50% had someone living alone who was 65 years of age or older. The average household size was 2.68 and the average family size was 3.14. As of the 2010 census, about 3.6 same-sex couples per 1,000 households were in the county.

In the county, the population was distributed as 28.90% under the age of 18, 13.40% from 18 to 24, 31.90% from 25 to 44, 17.00% from 45 to 64, and 8.80% who were 65 years of age or older. The median age was 29 years. For every 100 females, there were 100.80 males. For every 100 females age 18 and over, there were 99.30 males.

The median income for a household in the county was $36,872, and for a family was $41,455. Males had a median income of $28,031 versus $22,364 for females. The per capita income for the county was $17,219. About 9.70% of families and 12.10% of the population were below the poverty line, including 16.30% of those under age 18 and 9.80% of those age 65 or over.

Education
Bell County is served by several school districts:
 Academy Independent School District
 Bartlett Independent School District (partial)
 Belton Independent School District
 Bruceville-Eddy Independent School District (partial)
 Copperas Cove Independent School District (partial)
 Florence Independent School District (partial)
 Gatesville Independent School District (partial)
 Holland Independent School District (partial)
 Killeen Independent School District (partial)
 Lampasas Independent School District (partial)
 Moody Independent School District (partial)
 Rogers Independent School District (partial)
 Rosebud-Lott Independent School District (partial)
 Salado Independent School District
 Temple Independent School District
 Troy Independent School District

Transportation

Major highways
These major highways run through Bell County:
   Interstate 14/U.S. Highway 190
  Interstate 35
  State Highway 36
  State Highway 53
  State Highway 95
  State Highway 195

Mass transit
The Hill Country Transit District operates a regularly scheduled fixed-route bus service within the urban areas of Killeen and Temple, as well as a paratransit service throughout the county. Amtrak also has scheduled service to Temple.

Communities

Cities

 Bartlett (partly in Williamson County)
 Belton (county seat)
 Copperas Cove (mostly in Coryell County and a small part in Lampasas County)
 Harker Heights
 Killeen (largest city)
 Little River-Academy
 Morgan's Point Resort
 Nolanville
 Temple
 Troy

Towns
 Holland
 Rogers

Village
 Salado

Census-designated place
 Fort Hood (partly in Coryell County)
 Pendleton

Unincorporated communities

 Airville
 Belfalls
 Cedar Valley
 Cyclone
 Ding Dong
 Edgeworth
 Heidenheimer
 Joe Lee
 Leedale
 Maxdale
 Meeks
 Moffat
 New Colony
 Oenaville
 Oscar
 Owl Creek
 Prairie Dell
 Ratibor
 Red Ranger
 Seaton
 Sparks
 Stampede
 Summers Mill
 Union Grove
 Vilas
 White Hall
 Youngsport
 Zabcikville

Ghost towns
 Bland
 Brookhaven
 Donahoe
 Ocker
 Old Troy
 Stringtown

Politics

Politically, Bell County tends to support Republican Party candidates for office. It has voted for the Republican presidential nominee every cycle beginning with Ronald Reagan in 1980.

See also

 List of museums in Central Texas
 National Register of Historic Places listings in Bell County, Texas
 Recorded Texas Historic Landmarks in Bell County
 Hugh Shine, Republican member of the Texas House of Representatives from Bell County

References

External links

 
 
 Bell County from the Texas Almanac
 Bell County from the TXGenWeb Project
 Bell County Ex Confederate Association Ledger,  From 1888 To 1920.
 Historic Bell County materials, hosted by the Portal to Texas History.

 
Killeen–Temple–Fort Hood metropolitan area
Populated places established in 1850
1850 establishments in Texas
Texas Hill Country
Majority-minority counties in Texas